Thomas Whitney Surette (September 7, 1862 - May 19, 1941) was an American musician, composer and teacher.

Early life
Born in Concord, Massachusetts, the son of Louis Athanase Surette, an Acadian commission merchant from Nova Scotia, and Frances Jane Shattuck.

Career
Surette studied piano with Arthur Foote and composition with John Knowles Paine at Harvard University from 1889 to 1892, but failed to obtain a degree. In 1907, he was appointed music reader at Columbia University. In 1915, he founded Concord Summer School of Music, which operated until 1938. In 1921, he was appointed Director of Music at Bryn Mawr College.

Surette published the following: The Appreciation of Music (with D.G. Mason; 5 vols., of which vols. 2 and 5 were by Mason alone; N.Y., 1907; innumerable subsequent printings), and, on a more elevated plane, Course of Study on the Development of Symphonic Music (Chicago, 1915) and Music and Life (Boston, 1917); He wrote two light operas: "Priscilla, or The Pilgrim’s Proxy", after Longfellow (Concord, March 6, 1889; which had more than 1,000 subsequent performances in the US), and "The Eve of Saint Agnes" (1897), as well as  a romantic opera, "Cascabel, or The Broken Tryst"(Pittsburgh, May 15, 1899).

Surette was also largely responsible for the vogue of music appreciation courses that swept the country and spilled over into the British Isles.

Personal life
He married Ada Elizabeth Miles on June 20, 1899.

References

External links
Thomas Whitney Surette (1861-1941) : a Concord reformer : holograph, 1978 Mar. 10
Thomas Whitney Surette : musician and teacher 
Thomas Whitney Surette : a crusader for good music

1862 births
1941 deaths
American composers